The Monument to the Magdeburg Rights is a monument commemorating the return to Kyiv of its Magdeburg rights, which granted its right to self government. It is located in Podil Raion, Kyiv, at the foothills of the former Mykhailo Hill, next to the Shore Highway. It is considered to be the city's oldest monument. It is also called the Column of the Magdeburg Rights, the Baptizing of Ruthenia Monument, and the Lower Monument of the Saint Volodymyr. It is a scenic spot overlooking the Dnipro river, popular for local baptisms.

History

The monument was erected in 1802 to commemorate the return of Magdeburg rights which were first granted back in the 15th century by Alexander Jagiellon. The city's residents celebrated this event for three days with illumination and dance and later collected 10,000 rubles for the construction of a chapel and a monument with a fountain. The monument's author was the Kyiv architect Andrey Melensky. The brick pavilion over a spring was consecrated on August 15, 1802. Since 1804 the Metropolitan Serapion started crucessions to the monument for the blessing of the water. It is the place where Saint Volodymyr of Kyiv baptized his sons into the Christian faith.

See also
 Christianization of Kyivan Rus
 Independence Monument, Kyiv
 Monument to Prince Volodymyr

Further reading
 Encyclopedic handbook: Kyiv. Monument to the Magdeburg Rights. "Ukrainian Soviet Encyclopedia". Kyiv 1981.
 Tolochko, L., Hrybovska, O. Monument to the Saint Prince Volodymyr in Kyiv. "Tekhnika". Kyiv 2007.
 Zakrevsky, N. Description of Kyiv.

External links

 Magdeburg Column. gorodkiev.com.
 Monument to the Magdeburg Rights. turson.at.ua.

Monumental columns in Ukraine
Monuments and memorials in Kyiv
National Landmarks in Kyiv
Buildings and structures completed in 1802
1800s establishments in Ukraine
Magdeburg rights
Culture in Kyiv
Landmarks in Kyiv
Tourist attractions in Kyiv